In mathematics, the ratio test is a test (or "criterion") for the convergence of a series

The test was first published by Jean le Rond d'Alembert and is sometimes known as d'Alembert's ratio test or as the Cauchy ratio test.

The test 

The usual form of the test makes use of the limit

The ratio test states that:
 if L < 1 then the series converges absolutely; 
 if L > 1 then the series diverges;
 if L = 1 or the limit fails to exist, then the test is inconclusive, because there exist both convergent and divergent series that satisfy this case.

It is possible to make the ratio test applicable to certain cases where the limit L fails to exist, if limit superior and limit inferior are used. The test criteria can also be refined so that the test is sometimes conclusive even when L = 1. More specifically, let

.

Then the ratio test states that:
 if R < 1, the series converges absolutely;
 if r > 1, the series diverges;
 if  for all large n (regardless of the value of r), the series also diverges; this is because  is nonzero and increasing and hence  does not approach zero;
 the test is otherwise inconclusive.

If the limit L in  exists, we must have L = R = r. So the original ratio test is a weaker version of the refined one.

Examples

Convergent because L < 1 
Consider the series

Applying the ratio test, one computes the limit

Since this limit is less than 1, the series converges.

Divergent because L > 1 
Consider the series

Putting this into the ratio test:

Thus the series diverges.

Inconclusive because L = 1 
Consider the three series

The first series (1 + 1 + 1 + 1 + ⋯) diverges, the second one (the one central to the Basel problem) converges absolutely and the third one (the alternating harmonic series) converges conditionally. However, the term-by-term magnitude ratios  of the three series are respectively        and   . So, in all three cases, one has that the limit  is equal to 1. This illustrates that when L = 1, the series may converge or diverge, and hence the original ratio test is inconclusive.  In such cases, more refined tests are required to determine convergence or divergence.

Proof 

Below is a proof of the validity of the original ratio test.

Suppose that . We can then show that the series converges absolutely by showing that its terms will eventually become less than those of a certain convergent geometric series. To do this, consider a real number r such that . This implies that  for sufficiently large n; say, for all n greater than N. Hence  for each n > N and i > 0, and so

That is, the series converges absolutely.

On the other hand, if L > 1, then  for sufficiently large n, so that the limit of the summands is non-zero. Hence the series diverges.

Extensions for L = 1 

As seen in the previous example, the ratio test may be inconclusive when the limit of the ratio is 1. Extensions to the ratio test, however, sometimes allows one to deal with this case.

In all the tests below one assumes that Σan is a sum with positive an. These tests also may be applied to any series with a finite number of negative terms. Any such series may be written as:

where aN is the highest-indexed negative term. The first expression on the right is a partial sum which will be finite, and so the convergence of the entire series will be determined by the convergence properties of the second expression on the right, which may be re-indexed to form a series of all positive terms beginning at n=1.

Each test defines a test parameter (ρn) which specifies the behavior of that parameter needed to establish convergence or divergence. For each test, a weaker form of the test exists which will instead place restrictions upon limn->∞ρn.

All of the tests have regions in which they fail to describe the convergence properties of Σan. In fact, no convergence test can fully describe the convergence properties of the series. This is because if Σan is convergent, a second convergent series Σbn can be found which converges more slowly: i.e., it has the property that limn->∞ (bn/an) = ∞. Furthermore, if Σan is divergent, a second divergent series Σbn can be found which diverges more slowly: i.e., it has the property that limn->∞ (bn/an) = 0. Convergence tests essentially use the comparison test on some particular family of an, and fail for sequences which converge or diverge more slowly.

De Morgan hierarchy 

Augustus De Morgan proposed a hierarchy of ratio-type tests

The ratio test parameters below all generally involve terms of the form . This term can replace the former term in the definition of the test parameters and the conclusions drawn will remain the same. Accordingly, there will be no distinction drawn between references which use one or the other form of the test parameter.

1. d'Alembert's ratio test

The first test in the De Morgan hierarchy is the ratio test as described above.

2. Raabe's test

This extension is due to Joseph Ludwig Raabe. Define:

(and some extra terms, see Ali, Blackburn, Feld, Duris (none), Duris2)

The series will:
 Converge when there exists a c>1 such that  for all n>N.
 Diverge when  for all n>N.
 Otherwise, the test is inconclusive.

For the limit version, the series will:
 Converge if  (this includes the case ρ = ∞)
 Diverge if .
 If ρ = 1, the test is inconclusive.

When the above limit does not exist, it may be possible to use limits superior and inferior. The series will:
 Converge if 
 Diverge if 
 Otherwise, the test is inconclusive.

Proof of Raabe's test

Defining , we need not assume the limit exists; if , then  diverges, while if  the sum converges.

Suppose first that . Of course
if  then  for large , so the sum diverges; assume then that . There exists  such that  for all , which is to say that . Thus , which implies that

The proof of the other half is entirely analogous, with most of the inequalities simply reversed. We need a preliminary inequality to use
Note that
. So ; hence .

Suppose now that .

3. Bertrand's test 

This extension is due to Joseph Bertrand and Augustus De Morgan.

Defining:

Bertrand's test asserts that the series will:
 Converge when there exists a c>1 such that  for all n>N.
 Diverge when  for all n>N.
 Otherwise, the test is inconclusive.

For the limit version, the series will:
 Converge if  (this includes the case ρ = ∞)
 Diverge if .
 If ρ = 1, the test is inconclusive.

When the above limit does not exist, it may be possible to use limits superior and inferior. The series will:
 Converge if 
 Diverge if  
 Otherwise, the test is inconclusive.

4. Extended Bertrand's test 

This extension probably appeared at the first time by Margaret Martin in 1941. A short proof based on Kummer's test and without technical assumptions (such as existence of the limits, for example) was provided by Vyacheslav Abramov in 2019.

Let  be an integer, and let  denote the th iterate of natural logarithm, i.e.  and for any , 
.

Suppose that the ratio , when  is large, can be presented in the form

(The empty sum is assumed to be 0. With , the test reduces to Bertrand's test.)

The value  can be presented explicitly in the form

Extended Bertrand's test asserts that the series
 Converge when there exists a  such that  for all .
 Diverge when  for all .
 Otherwise, the test is inconclusive.

For the limit version, the series 
 Converge if  (this includes the case )
 Diverge if .
 If , the test is inconclusive.

When the above limit does not exist, it may be possible to use limits superior and inferior. The series 
 Converge if 
 Diverge if  
 Otherwise, the test is inconclusive.

For applications of Extended Bertrand's test see birth–death process.

5. Gauss's test 

This extension is due to Carl Friedrich Gauss.

Assuming an > 0 and r > 1, if a bounded sequence Cn can be found such that for all n:

then the series will:
 Converge if 
 Diverge if

6. Kummer's test 

This extension is due to Ernst Kummer.

Let ζn be an auxiliary sequence of positive constants. Define

Kummer's test states that the series will:
 Converge if there exists a  such that  for all n>N. (Note this is not the same as saying )
 Diverge if  for all n>N and  diverges.

For the limit version, the series will:
 Converge if  (this includes the case ρ = ∞)
 Diverge if  and  diverges.
 Otherwise the test is inconclusive

When the above limit does not exist, it may be possible to use limits superior and inferior. The series will
 Converge if 
 Diverge if  and  diverges.

Special cases 

All of the tests in De Morgan's hierarchy except Gauss's test can easily be seen as special cases of Kummer's test:
 For the ratio test, let ζn=1. Then:

 For Raabe's test, let ζn=n. Then:

 For Bertrand's test, let ζn=n ln(n). Then:

Using  and approximating  for large n, which is negligible compared to the other terms,  may be written:

 For Extended Bertrand's test, let  From the Taylor series expansion for large  we arrive at the approximation 

where the empty product is assumed to be 1. Then,

Hence,

Note that for these four tests, the higher they are in the De Morgan hierarchy, the more slowly the  series diverges.

Proof of Kummer's test

If  then fix a positive number .  There exists
a natural number  such that for every 

Since , for every 

In particular  for all  which means that starting from the index

the sequence  is monotonically decreasing and
positive which in particular implies that it is bounded below by 0. Therefore, the limit
 exists.
This implies that the positive  telescoping series
 is convergent,
and since for all 

by the direct comparison test for positive series, the series
 is convergent.

Tong's modification of Kummer's test

A new version of Kummer's test was established by Tong. See also 

for further discussions and new proofs. The provided modification of Kummer's theorem characterizes
all positive series, and the convergence or divergence can be formulated in the form of two necessary and sufficient conditions, one for convergence and another for divergence.

The first of these statements can be simplified as follows: 

The second statement can be simplified similarly:

However, it becomes useless, since the condition  in this case reduces to the original claim

Ali's second ratio test 
A more refined ratio test is the second ratio test:
For  define:

By the second ratio test, the series will:
 Converge if 
 Diverge if 
 If  then the test is inconclusive.

If the above limits do not exist, it may be possible to use the limits superior and inferior. Define:

Then the series will:
 Converge if 
 Diverge if 
 If  then the test is inconclusive.

Ali's mth ratio test 

This test is a direct extension of the second ratio test. For  and positive  define:

By the th ratio test, the series will:
 Converge if 
 Diverge if 
 If  then the test is inconclusive.

If the above limits do not exist, it may be possible to use the limits superior and inferior. For  define:

Then the series will:
 Converge if 
 Diverge if 
 If , then the test is inconclusive.

Ali--Deutsche Cohen φ-ratio test 

This test is an extension of the th ratio test.

Assume that the sequence  is a positive decreasing sequence.

Let  be such that  exists. Denote , and assume .

Assume also that 

Then the series will:

 Converge if 
 Diverge if 
 If , then the test is inconclusive.

See also
 Root test
 Radius of convergence

Footnotes

References 
.
: §8.14.
 : §3.3, 5.4.
 : §3.34.
 
 
 
 : §2.36, 2.37.

Convergence tests
Articles containing proofs

it:Criteri di convergenza#Criterio del rapporto (o di d'Alembert)